Mak Tze Wing (born 31 July 1998) is a Hong Konger table tennis player. Her highest career ITTF ranking was 86.

References

1998 births
Living people
Hong Kong female table tennis players